Nizhny Muynak (Tübänge Muynaq) is a rural locality (a village) in Muynaksky Selsoviet, Zianchurinsky District, Bashkortostan, Russia. The population was 73 as of 2010. There is 1 street.

Geography 
Nizhny Muynak is located 30 km southeast of Isyangulovo (the district's administrative centre) by road. Nizhnyaya Akberda is the nearest rural locality.

References 

Rural localities in Zianchurinsky District